Polymixia berndti is a species of beardfish found in the Indian and Pacific Oceans.  This species grows to a length of  SL.

Appearance and anatomy
The species has 4-5 dorsal spines and 28-31 dorsal soft rays. It is usually dusky-greenish or silver.

Environment and climate
Polymixia berndti is found in reef-associated deep water locations in the Indo-Pacific Ocean. The species is also distributed below Australia, north of Japan, and in the aquatic region from East Africa to the Hawaiian Islands.

Polymixia berndti has a depth range of 18 – 585 m.

References

External links
 

Polymixiiformes